Pegasystems Inc. is an American software company based in Cambridge, Massachusetts. Founded in 1983, Pegasystems develops software for customer relationship management (CRM) and business process management (BPM). The company has been publicly traded since 1996 as PEGA (NASDAQ). Pega is a low-code platform for workflow automation and AI-powered decisioning.

History

1983–2002 
Alan Trefler founded Pegasystems in 1983 at the age of 27, in Cambridge, Massachusetts. Prior to founding the company, in the early 1980s Trefler had developed computer systems that could play chess. During the company's early years it focused on providing case management, namely for companies such as American Express. Trefler recollects that when he started Pegasystems, he wanted to create software for business people, how business-people wanted things to work. An article in Computerworld traces business rules engine to the early 1990s and to products from Pegasystems, Fair Isaac Corp and ILOG. As a private company, Pegasystems was "bootstrapped" initially, but did not take on outside investors. The company went public in 1996 with initial and secondary public offerings,  and began trading on NASDAQ under the symbol PEGA. Raising several millions in funding in the process, going public freed the company from needing to pursue venture capital investments. Pegasystems entered a period of financial trouble in the late 1990s, following a dispute with its accountants, Ernst & Young. After restating their earnings, Pegasystems faced an investigation by the SEC, which was dropped in 2002.

2010–present 
In March 2010, Pegasystems acquired the  enterprise software company Chordiant for around $161.5 million.  The acquisition gave Pegasystems access to new markets such as online training, telecommunications and healthcare, with Pegasystems integrating Chordiant and its customer relationship management (CRM) technology into its existing operations. Pega Cloud was introduced using Amazon Web Services in 2012, and in October 2013, Pegasystems acquired the mobile application developer Antenna Software for $27.7 million. Located in New Jersey, Antenna also had bases in Kraków and Bangalore.

In 2014, Pegasystems hired a cloud technology proponent to develop its cloud technology strategy. Over the following year, Pegasystems invested in network operations in North America and India to support its cloud services. In May 2014, Pegasystems acquired the Bangalore-based MeshLabs, a text mining and analytics software startup. The Times of India reported that Pegasystems would integrate MeshLabs's text analytics software to "gather unstructured social media data and decode it into actionable business insights for its clients." The financial details of the transaction were not disclosed. Pegasystems acquired Firefly in June 2014, a co-browsing tool funded by First Round Capital. The startup from Philadelphia, Pennsylvania was the company's first move into the cobrowsing market. By the summer of 2014, Pegasystems remained headquartered in Cambridge, Massachusetts with 2,700 employees. By July 2014 the company was worth around US$1 billion.

By early 2015, Pegasystems remained a publicly traded company on the Nasdaq, with 3,000 employees, 30 offices, and "more than half a billion dollars in revenue."  As of February 2015, the company had active partnerships with IT outsourcing companies such as Hexaware, NIIT Incessant Technologies, Tata Consultancy Services, Infosys, Wipro, HCL Technologies, Accenture and Cognizant. By September of that year, companies who had built teams of Pegasystems specialists included Virtusa (engineering and solution delivery partner since 2001), Accenture, Ernst & Young and Cognizant.  Between 2005 and 2015, Pegasystems had average sales growth of 21% per year. There was a steady rise in the company's share price in 2015, with higher than expected revenues from the year prior. In January 2016, it was reported that Pegasystems planned on raising its number of employees significantly, and the company announced the acquisition of OpenSpan Inc. in April 2016. Based in Atlanta, Georgia, OpenSpan specialized in robotic process automation and workforce analytics software.

In 2016, Pegasystems announced training and certification on the Pega 7 platform for educators and students. Clients Google, Aflac, and Anthem promoted Pega software at the 2018 PegaWorld conference, an annual conference held since 2006.

In February 2019, Pegasystems purchased Infruid Labs, a business analytics and data visualization software company. In May 2019, the company bought In The Chat, a digital messaging platform.

Since March 2020, Pegasystems has sponsored the Boston punk band Dropkick Murphys.

In January 2021, the company announced it had acquired Qurious.io, which provides a cloud service that analyzes voice calls in real time to support customer service representatives.

In June 2021, Pegasystems became the official supplier of the Ryder Cup. The company also sponsors pro golfers Marc Leishman and Mel Reid. In June 2021, Reid wore Pegasystems' Pride logo, one of the first times the logo has been worn in professional golf.

In May 2022, a jury verdict awarded Appian Corporation $2.036 billion in damages for trade secret misappropriation and a damages award of $1 for a violation of the Virginia Computer Crimes Act, which Pega plans to appeal. The company will not be required to begin paying the judgement until all avenues of appeal have been exhausted. In February 2023, Pega filed an appeal asking the court to overturn the previous judgement and either rule in Pega’s favor or order a new trial.

In 2022, Pegasystems acquired Everflow, a Brazilian process mining company to support their process mining and hyper automation goals. The company also entered into a partnership with Celebrus, a CDP Vendor. The partnership resulted in the release of Always-On Insights which allows customer data and advertising data to drive automated marketing campaigns.

Products and services
Pegasystems develops and supports software for customer engagement and operations. In particular, Pegasystems specializes in software for business process management (BPM) and customer relationship management (CRM), and is seen as offering more bespoke technology than competitors such as Oracle Corporation or SAP ERP. The company's core software product is the Pega Platform, part of its Pega Infinity suite of applications for customer engagement and digital process automation, which are designed to connect customer interfaces with back-end process automation. Pegasystems states its applications are certified to work on Google Cloud and other public cloud platforms, including Microsoft Azure, Amazon Web Services, and Pivotal’s Cloud Foundry. Various Kubernetes environments are supported. In 2018 Pega announced platform additions that used artificial intelligence for marketing campaigns, customer interfaces, and robotic automation, as well as a Blockchain kit for Ethereum.

As of late 2013, Pegasystem’s core software, PegaRULES Process Commander (PRPC), was related to BPM. Pegasystems Inc. in March 2016 announced the Pega Client Lifecycle Management (CLM) application. The company added artificial intelligence into its customer service software to allow interactions to occur on multiple communication channels at once. The company’s low-code development platform was highlighted in a 2018 Wall Street Journal article, with Pegasystems’ chief technology officer explaining that the software allowed developers to "drag and drop [ready-made software components] to configure applications,” minimizing development time. The company's core product is the Pega Platform, which is part of its Pega Infinity suite of applications for customer engagement and robotic process automation.

In April 2020, during the COVID-19 pandemic, Pegasystems announced an application for financial institutions to manage emergency loan applications from small businesses seeking COVID-19 financial relief. Throughout 2020, Pegasystems helped several of its clients, including the Bavarian government and the Commonwealth Bank of Australia, develop apps to manage issues that arose because of COVID-19.

Pega’s Voice AI and Messaging AI analyze live customer service conversations in real time to help service agents resolve service requests with reduced manual effort.

Clients and projects
Pegasystems specializes in the following industries: financial services, insurance, life sciences, healthcare, government, manufacturing, high tech, communications and media, energy, and utilities. While core areas have traditionally included banking and financial sectors, more recent areas include manufacturing, life sciences and healthcare. As of 2013, other clients included "largely Fortune 500 companies" such as ING, Lloyds Banking Group, BAA,  and the state of Maine, which commissioned Pegasystems to create a BPM system to cut administrative costs. By July 2014, PayPal, Cisco Systems, and Philips were using Pegasystems’ CRM software,  and BNY Mellon announced they would be integrating Pega into its operation.

In 2017, Global business insurer QBE began using RPA software from Pegasystems to automate processes and reduce employee workloads. Ford Motor Company began using Pegasystems’ low code/no code platform for citizen development. Johnson & Johnson developed their ClinApp built on Pegasystems’ Infinity suite of applications.

See also 
 Advanced case management
 Comparison of Business Process Modeling Notation tools
 SAML-based products and services

References

External links
 

American companies established in 1983
Software companies established in 1983
1983 establishments in Massachusetts
Companies based in Cambridge, Massachusetts
Software companies based in Massachusetts
Customer relationship management software companies
Companies listed on the Nasdaq
1996 initial public offerings
Software companies of the United States
Workflow technology
Low Code Application Platform